António Carlos Sousa Laranajeira Lima Taí (born 11 August 1948, Amarante) is a former Portuguese footballer who played for Boavista and FC Porto, as left back.

Taí gained 4 caps for the Portugal national team.

External links 
 

1948 births
Living people
People from Amarante, Portugal
Boavista F.C. players
FC Porto players
Portugal international footballers
Portuguese footballers
Primeira Liga players
Association football fullbacks
Sportspeople from Porto District